Nanda Gond is the Himalayan mountain peak situated in the Pithoragarh district of Uttarakhand state of India. It is  located in the Milam valley on the east of Milam Glacier. Ikualari (6,059 m), Nanda Pal (6,306 m), Nital Thaur (6,236 m), are its neighbouring peaks. The Unta Dhura Pass is located north to it.

Mountains of Uttarakhand
Geography of Pithoragarh district
Six-thousanders of the Himalayas